The Men's long jump event at the 2011 World Championships in Athletics was held at the Daegu Stadium on September 1 and 2.

Defending champion Dwight Phillips had not done well early in the season, only finishing tenth in the USA Outdoor Track and Field Championships.  But as defending champion, he was given the automatic entry into the meet.  On his qualifying jump he showed the first sign of life, jumping a season best 8.32 to lead qualifying.  Of the rest of the field, only Mitchell Watt achieved an automatic qualifier.  Will Claye achieved a rare feat by qualifying for final in both the Long Jump and Triple Jump.

In the final, Phillips almost matched his qualifying jump with an 8.31 to take the early lead.  Ngonidzashe Makusha came close with an 8.29 in the same round.  Mitchell Watt bested the early leaders with an 8.33 in the second round, but not before Phillips had jumped an 8.45 to separate from the field.  Nobody was able to improve after that.

After the event, Phillips celebrated by showing his assigned bib number 1111, significant for his first-place finish in four World Championships.

Medalists

Records
Prior to the competition, the established records were as follows.

Qualification standards

Schedule

Results

Qualification
Qualification: Qualifying Performance 8.15 (Q) or at least 12 best performers (q) advance to the final.

Final

References

External links
Long jump results at IAAF website

Long jump
Long jump at the World Athletics Championships